Edgardo Ruiz is a Puerto Rican ten-pin bowler. He finished in 23rd position of the combined rankings at the 2006 AMF World Cup and was part of the trio (with Bruno Diaz and Julio Wiscovitch) obtaining the 9th place in the 20th Central American and Caribbean Sports Games.

References

Living people
Puerto Rican ten-pin bowling players
1958 births

Central American and Caribbean Games bronze medalists for Puerto Rico
Competitors at the 2006 Central American and Caribbean Games
Central American and Caribbean Games medalists in bowling